The old Stadtfriedhof  (City Cemetery) in Göttingen is a historic cemetery with graves of important scholars. It is the final resting place of no less than eight Nobel Prize winners: Max Born, Otto Hahn, Max von Laue, Walther Nernst, Max Planck, Otto Wallach, Adolf Windaus, Richard Zsigmondy and Manfred Eigen.

Location and history
The cemetery is located at the western edge of the city of Göttingen.

Due to the growing population of Göttingen in 1879  Mayor Georg Merkel decided to create a new cemetery at the city limits at Grone, today a suburb of Göttingen. The cemetery chapel was designed by city architect Heinrich Gerber during the first expansion of the cemetery around the turn of the century. This was the first of five expansions, the last of which was in 1963. In 1975 the town burial site was moved to the newly created  Parkfriedhof Junkerberg. Since then, only existing burial rights are allowed at the Göttingen City Cemetery. A redesign of the site to a park has been repeatedly discussed, but has not yet been done.

In the centre of the cemetery about 1000 graves form a memorial cemetery for the victims of war and tyranny. There is also an old, small, Jewish cemetery on the northwest side of the cemetery, with burial sites dating back to 1843.

Graves 

Eight Nobel Prize winners are buried here:
Max Born, Physics 1954 
Otto Hahn, Chemistry 1944 
Max von Laue, Physics 1914 
Walther Nernst, Chemistry 1920 
Max Planck, Physics 1918 
Otto Wallach, Chemistry 1910 
Adolf Windaus, Chemistry, 1928 
Richard Zsigmondy, Chemistry 1925 
Manfred Eigen, Chemistry 1967

In addition, the city cemetery is also the final resting place of:
Friedrich Carl Andreas, Iranist and orientalist 
Lou Andreas-Salomé, essayist and psychoanalyst 
George Frideric Calsow, politician, mayor of Göttingen 
Hermann Foege, lawyer and politician 
David Hilbert mathematician
Bruno Karl August Jung, Göttingen politician, mayor  
Gottfried Jungmichel, university teacher and politician 
Walter Meyerhoff, lawyer and politician 
Karl Schwarzschild, astronomer and physicist 
Wilhelm Eduard Weber, physicist 
Konrat Ziegler, classical scholar, Righteous Among the Nations

Notes

See also

 List of famous cemeteries

Cemeteries in Germany
Lutheran cemeteries
Göttingen
Protected areas of Lower Saxony
Buildings and structures in Göttingen (district)
Lutheran cemeteries in Germany